Margo Miljand (born on 8 July 1970, Põltsamaa) is an Estonian politician.

In 2011–2012, he was the chairman of People's Union of Estonia.

References

Living people
1970 births
People's Union of Estonia politicians
Conservative People's Party of Estonia politicians
People from Põltsamaa